Bidhuna is a town and a nagar panchayat in Auraiya district  in the state of Uttar Pradesh, India.

Geography
It has an average elevation of 133 metres (436 feet). Arind river crosses through Bidhuna.

Demographics
 India census, Bidhuna had a population of 27,161. Males constitute 53% of the population and females 47%. Bidhuna has an average literacy rate of 74%, higher than the national average of 59.5%; with male literacy of 78% and female literacy of 68%. 15% of the population is under 6 years of age.

References

Cities and towns in Auraiya district